"All for Nothing" is a song by American rock band Linkin Park featuring American guitarist and singer Page Hamilton of alternative metal band Helmet from their sixth studio album, The Hunting Party. The song appears on the album as the second track. It has entered the UK Rock chart at number 23, although it hasn't been released as a single. The song was written by the band and produced by co-lead vocalist Mike Shinoda and lead guitarist Brad Delson. The song is featured in the video game Pro Evolution Soccer 2015.

Composition
"All for Nothing" is explained in an early preview for the album as, "This one, when performed live, will get the crowd moving for sure. With a hip-hop flow in the first verse this quickly turns into almost a punk anthem. The song is relentless and unapologetic, with a stellar guitar solo by Brad Delson. It’s no surprise that this heavy tune is hardcore especially since it features a guest spot Helmet vocalist and guitarist Page Hamilton." The song continues its outro into the band's first single from the album, "Guilty All the Same".

Reception
In a track-by-track review for the album, by Billboard the song is given positive review and explained as, "The guitars stay heavy, but the drums slow down and swing just enough for Shinoda to bust some nimble rhymes about refusing to obey orders. It doesn't really matter who he's railing against — this is defiance for defiance's sake. That's Helmet's Page Hamilton on the chorus, lending credibility more than anything else."

Charts

References

2014 songs
Linkin Park songs
Songs written by Mike Shinoda
American hard rock songs
Post-hardcore songs